Rerrkirrwanga Mununggurr is an artist from Arnhem Land, Northern Territory, Australia, renowned for her finally detailed paintings on bark. She is the youngest daughter of the artist Djutjadjutja Munungurr who taught her to paint.  In the 1990s Rerrkirrwanga finished some of the works attributed to her father. She now has authority to paint her own stories and her large-scale works on bark are in Australian and international collections.

Biography 
Born in 1971 in Arnhem Land, her family is part of the Djapu clan of the Yolngu people. Her father Djutjadjutja Munungurr, older sister Marrnyula Mununggurr, and mother Nonggirrnga Marawili all work as artists.  She is married to Gumatj artist Yalpi Yunupingu.

Rerrkirrwanga works actively at the Buku-Larrnggay Mulka Art Centre located in Yirrkala, an Aboriginal community about 700 kilometres east of Darwin. This is the Indigenous community-controlled art centre of Northeast Arnhem Land.

In 2014 she travelled to Santa Fe, New Mexico, USA for her solo exhibition at Chiaroscuro Gallery.

Bark Paintings (nuwayak) 
At the Buku-Larrnggay Mulka Art Centre, at the end of the wet season, Stringybark trees are stripped of their bark which is then wet, cured by fire, weighted, and left to dry. Ochres and earth pigments in red, yellow, black, and white are collected from known deposits. Brushes are made with human hair tied to a stick. These brushes are called mawat, and Rerrkirrwanga’s are known to be among the finest, accounting for her meticulously detailed bark paintings. Rerrkirrwanga’s bark paintings are so finally detailed they take weeks of careful concentration.

On the dried barks, the artists paint sacred designs that belong to themselves or to their clans. They use meticulous layering of individual strokes to produce cross hatched patterns, each pattern belonging to a particular estate, clan, moiety, or place. Rerrkirrwanga often paints stories and patterns related to her husband’s clan Gumatj. The elders at Buku-Larrnggay Mulka Art Centre have resisted painting with acrylics on canvas or board and continue the use of natural pigments and sheets of bark.

Awards 
In 2009 Rerrkirrwanga won Best Bark Painting category in the National Aboriginal and Torres Strait Islander Art awards with a particularly fine work--Gumatj Gurtha--depicting her husband’s clan designs of fire. The fire is called Gurtha and is pictorially represented as trails of diamond. The diamond design, represents the various states of fire; the red flames, the white smoke and ash, the black charcoal and the yellow dust. The totemic significance of fire to the Yunupiŋu family of the Gumatj is paramount.

Exhibitions 
Since 1994 her art has appeared in more than 30 exhibitions across Australia, and in 2014 she had a solo exhibition in Santa Fe, New Mexico.

Collections 
Her works can be seen in the following public collections:

 Australian National Maritime Museum, Darling Harbour, Sydney, NSW
 Kluge-Ruhe Aboriginal Art Collection, University of Virginia, USA
 National Gallery of Australia, Canberra ACT
 National Gallery of Victoria, Melbourne.

Her work is also in many private collections in Australia and abroad.

References 

Living people
Year of birth missing (living people)
Australian Aboriginal artists
People from the Northern Territory
20th-century Australian women artists
20th-century Australian artists
21st-century Australian women artists
21st-century Australian artists